Howard Wright biplane may refer to:
Howard Wright 1909 Biplane
Howard Wright 1910 Biplane